is a Japanese actress, singer, and psychological counselor who is represented by Office Keiko. She is eldest of three siblings (one brother and one younger brother).

Filmography

Films

References

External links
 

Japanese actresses
Japanese women singers
1960 births
Living people
Horikoshi High School alumni
Actors from Saitama Prefecture
Musicians from Saitama Prefecture
People from Kawaguchi, Saitama